Richard Gordon or Dick Gordon may refer to:

Richard Gordon (actor), American actor in vaudeville and films and on stage and radio
Richard Gordon (English author) (1921–2017), English novelist, screenwriter and doctor
Richard Gordon (lawyer), president of the American Jewish Congress
Richard Gordon (American football) (born 1987), American football player for the Denver Broncos
Richard F. Gordon Jr. (1929–2017), American astronaut
Richard Gordon (film producer) (1925–2011), British film producer
Richard Gordon (broadcaster) (born 1960), Scottish sports broadcaster
Richard Gordon (Scottish author) (1947–2009), Scottish author
R. H. Gordon (1844–1917), American politician
Richard Gordon (photographer) (1945–2012), American photographer
Richard Gordon (theoretical biologist) (born 1943), American theoretical biologist

See also
Rich Gordon (born 1948), American politician from California
Rick Gordon (born 1958), Scottish rugby union player
Dick Gordon (disambiguation)